Edakkattuvayal is a village in the Ernakulam district of Kerala, India. It is located in the Kanayannur taluk. Toc H Institute of Science and Technology, AP Varkky Mission Hospital and Chinmaya Mission are major  institutions in the area.

Demographics 

According to the 2011 census of India, Edakkattuvayal has 2966 households. The literacy rate of the village is 89.3%.

References 

Villages in Kanayannur taluk